The Gilbert H. Hamilton House is a historic building in the Glen Echo neighborhood of Columbus, Ohio. It was listed on the National Register of Historic Places in 1992 and the Columbus Register of Historic Properties in 2018. The house, completed in 1927, overlooks the Glen Echo Ravine. It was built for Gilbert H. and Caroline J. Hamilton; the family lived there until 1952.

See also
 National Register of Historic Places listings in Columbus, Ohio

References

Houses on the National Register of Historic Places in Ohio
Italianate architecture in Ohio
Houses completed in 1927
Houses in Columbus, Ohio
National Register of Historic Places in Columbus, Ohio
Columbus Register properties
Individually listed contributing properties to historic districts on the National Register in Ohio
Historic district contributing properties in Columbus, Ohio